Universität/Markt is a stop on the Bonn Stadtbahn in Bonn, Germany. It is located directly beneath the Hofgarten and runs parallel to the main building of the University of Bonn.

The eastern entrance to the stop, which opens out onto Stockenstraße, is unusual in that it uses a series of long ramps for access instead of the usual combination of stairs and escalators.

References

Buildings and structures in Bonn
Railway stations in North Rhine-Westphalia
Underground rapid transit in Germany
Cologne-Bonn Stadtbahn stations
Railway stations at university and college campuses